Too Phat was a Malaysian hip-hop duo, composed of rappers Joe Flizzow (born Johan Ishak in Kuala Lumpur; 16 October 1979) and Malique (born Malique Ibrahim in Johor Bahru; 21 August 1977).

Career

In the late 1990s Joe Flizzow, Malique and Kevin Felix @ Doctah'K at that time formed a musical trio who later became a duo under the Positive Tone label. Their first big break came in 1999 when their first singles, Li'l Fingaz and Too Phat Baby entered normal rotation on local radio.

On the back of the success of these first singles, work soon began on an album entitled whuttadilly?. So far, Plan B has sold over 4,500,000 copies, earning double platinum status in Malaysia.

The music video for a track from Plan B, "Just a Friend", was produced in collaboration with Maxis Hotlink and debuted on Malaysian television channel NTV7. The video features cameo appearances from local artistes M. Nasir, Fauziah Latiff and Ferhad, and Malaysian track and field athlete Watson Nyambek. Most of the scenes were shot locally, in the city of Kuala Lumpur. The group controversially used their video to confront issues regarding homosexuality, addressing a topic which is usually avoided in conservative Malaysia. Too Phat have also collaborated with American hip hop artist Warren G.

In 2005, they produced their fourth and last studio album Rebirth into Reality featuring various hip-hop artists from East Asia. The album's first single Dua Dunia features award-winning Malaysian singer Siti Nurhaliza. The duo went on indefinite hiatus with Malique and Joe Flizzow pursue their solo careers.

In 2010, Too Phat reunited for a short period to promote their single, "Masih Hip Hop".

Solo career

The respective Phat boys started to venture in their solo career after their last public performance for Kanye West in 2007. Malique with his solo album OK (2008), K.O The Mixtape ( a collaboration with DJ Fuzz -2009) and TKO: Pejamkan Mata  under his own label named Qarma Musiq. Rumours going around between rappers and fans said that Malique will release a new English album in 2017, but until now (2019) no news regarding the album.

Joe Flizzow releases his first solo album President on 31 December 2008 under Warner Music Malaysia as the distributor and Havoc on 7 November 2013.

Aku Tanya Apa Khabar
During 2015 Anugerah Juara Lagu Award (AJL) the song Apa Khabar by Joe Flizzow (feat. SonaOne) had win top prize on that night. The song lyric talked about Joe reminiscing the memory that he had with Malique and he saying hello to him. Despite receiving mix criticism by the masses. one side were booing due to the fact that the hip hop/R&B song winning the top prize which is not a very popular genres among Malaysian themselves while on that night while the other side is the long time fan of Too Phat that praise Joe for making them reminiscing to their nostalgic memories.

Recent developments
As of 2016 Joe Flizzow's projects mostly involved Kartel Records, a record label that he had founded in 2005. Numerous local and R&B artist had signed under his label with notable names like Altimet and SonaOne.

As for Malique, he has become more reclusive and prefers to keep his personal life private after the Too Phat days. Despite releasing numerous top hit collaboration tracks with other local artists such as Mantera Beradu (feat. M Nasir -2008), Senyum (feat. Najwa -2010) Aku Maafkan Kamu ( feat. Jamal Abdilah -2011), Teman Pengganti (feat. Black -2012) Malique seems to shy away from the public and declines to appear on any shows or interviews. In an interview in 2011, Malique was quoted saying him being able to sell his music without making public appearances made him feel more comfortable and he has no intentions to change that.

As of December 2016, it is announced that his new solo album may be out with the title TKO in 2016 under his own label Qarma Music. Malique intends to release an English album in 2017.

Discography

Albums
Studio albums
1999: Whuttadilly
2001: Plan B
2002: 360°
2005: Rebirth into Reality

Collaborative album
2002: Phat Family (with various)

Compilation albums
2004: Too Phat: Classics
2006: Too Phat: Too Furious
2007: Too Phat: The Greatest Hits
 The Best of Too Phat

Solo albums
2008: The President (Joe Flizzow)
2008: OK (Malique)
2009: K.O: The Mixtape (Malique & DJ Fuzz)
2013: Havoc (Joe Flizzow)
2016: TKO: Pejamkan Mata (Malique)

Singles
 Li'l Fingaz
 Too Phat Baby
 Jezzebelle
 Anak Ayam
 Tell Shorty (feat. Ruffedge & V.E.)
 Just A Friend (feat. V.E.)
 You (feat. Sharifah Aini)
 Ala Canggung (feat. Lil' Marissa)
 Where My Love At
 Just A Li'l Bit (feat. Warren G)
 Alhamdulilah (feat. Yasin, Ahli Fiqir & Dian Sastrowardoyo)
 Dua Dunia (feat. Siti Nurhaliza)
 Snap
 KL
 Showtime
 How Me Seksi (feat. Inul Daratista)
 To The World Cup - 2006
 Feels So Good (Emcee David ft. Joe Flizzow) - 2006
 Jari Jemari (Camillia ft. Joe Flizzow) - 2007
 Get It Done (Air Force Ones featuring Yg Ariff) - 2007
 1000 Verses (ALI ft. Joe Flizzow)
 One Night Lover (Rossa ft. Joe Flizzow) - 2012

Awards and achievements

2002 Best Engineered Album
Best Local English Album - Plan B
2003 Anugerah Kembara Prestigious Award
2004 Best Group in a Vocal Performance in an album - 360° 
Best Local English Album
2006 Best Local English Album - Rebirth into Reality 
Best Album Cover -Rebirth into Reality
ERA Radio Awards Anugerah ERA
2001 Choice Local English Artiste
2002 Choice Local English Artiste
2003 Choice Local English Artiste
2004 Choice Local English Artiste
Nominee MTV Asia Awards 2002, 2004 and 2005
HP Inter-Action (five countries, five club realtime podcast concert) 2006 – Singapore, Taiwan, Korea, Malaysia, Hong Kong.
Owner of State of Mine Caps (KL caps)
Kanye West -Touch The Sky Tour, Malaysia, 2006 (Opening act)
Recharge Revelation - Global Gathering, A Famosa, 2007
Quiksilver 2.0 Revolution Tour, Kuala Lumpur & Bali, 2007
Bacardi Mix and Match Tour, China, 2008
Sunburst KL, 2008

References

External links
Too Phat's Official Website
Review of Rebirth Into Reality
Joe Flizzow Blog
Kartel Records
State of Mine by Kartel Clothing
Kartel Official Network

Malaysian hip hop groups
Musical groups established in 1998
Musical groups disestablished in 2007
Hip hop duos
1998 establishments in Malaysia
2007 disestablishments in Malaysia